Richard Carroll "Dick" Connor (born March 25, 1934) is a diver from the United States and Olympic bronze medalist. He represented his native country at the 1956 Summer Olympics in Melbourne, where he received a bronze medal.

Connor was born in Pueblo, Colorado. He attended the University of Southern California.

References

1934 births
Living people
Divers at the 1956 Summer Olympics
Olympic bronze medalists for the United States in diving
University of Southern California alumni
American male divers

Medalists at the 1956 Summer Olympics
20th-century American people
21st-century American people